Spain took part in the Eurovision Song Contest 1962. This is the second time that Spain participated in the Eurovision Song Contest. The country was represented by Víctor Balaguer with the song "Llámame". "Llámame" was written by Miguel Portoles and composed by Mario Selles. The song was chosen through a national final.

Before Eurovision

National final 
The national final took place at RNE's studios in Barcelona and was aired through radio, hosted by Federico Gallo. Sixteen songs were presented in a semi-final on February 5, and ten of these songs went forward to the national final that took place on February 6. Víctor Balaguer was proclaimed winner with "Llámame" by the votes of 10 regional radio stations.

At Eurovision
Víctor Balaguer was the third to perform in the running order, following Belgium and preceding Austria. He received nul point for his performance, sharing the last place with Belgium, Austria and the Netherlands.

Voting 
Spain did not receive any points at the 1962 Eurovision Song Contest.

References

1962
Countries in the Eurovision Song Contest 1962
Eurovision